Mohammed Mahbub Husain (known as Ed Husain) (born 25 December 1974)  is a British author and academic. He is also a professor in the Walsh School of Foreign Service in Georgetown University. As a political advisor he has worked with leaders and governments across the world. He has held senior fellowships at think tanks in London and New York, including at the Council on Foreign Relations (CFR) at the height of the Arab uprisings (2010–2015). While at CFR, his policy innovation memo led to the US-led creation of a Geneva-based global fund to help counter terrorism.  He is also a member of the Editorial Board of the Studies in Conflict & Terrorism, a monthly peer-reviewed academic journal covering research on terrorism and insurgency.

Husain was a senior advisor to former British Prime Minister Tony Blair (2015–2018). From 2018–2021 he completed his doctoral studies on Western philosophy and Islam under the direction of the English philosopher Sir Roger Scruton. He is the author of The Islamist (Penguin, 2007), The House of Islam: A Global History (Bloomsbury, 2018), and Among the Mosques (Bloomsbury, 2021). His writing has been shortlisted for the George Orwell Prize. A regular contributor to the Spectator magazine, he has appeared on the BBC and CNN and has written for the Telegraph, The Times, the New York Times, the Guardian and other publications.

Early life 
Husain was born and brought up in the East End of London, in a Bengali Muslim family. Husain's father was born in British India and his mother in East Pakistan (now Bangladesh). His mother has Saudi Arabian heritage, specifically in the Hejaz region. His father arrived in the United Kingdom in 1961, and started a small Indian takeaway business in Limehouse.

In his early years, Husain was brought up in Limehouse and attended a local primary school called the Sir William Burrough School, and he attended secondary school called Stepney Green School.

Husain attended the Brick Lane Mosque in his early years with his parents, who followed a spiritual form of Islam based on Sufi traditions.

Education 
Husain has a BA in history from the University of North London, and later studied at SOAS, University of London, where he completed an MA in Middle Eastern Studies.

His doctoral research was under the supervision of Sir Roger Scruton at The University of Buckingham.

Career 
After completing his undergraduate degree, Husain worked for HSBC in London for several years. He then moved to Damascus with his wife in 2002, where he worked for the British Council teaching English whilst studying Arabic at the University of Damascus. After two years in Syria, Husain and his wife moved to Jeddah to be closer to the Muslim holy sites of Mecca and Medina while continuing to work for the British Council.

Upon his return to Britain, Husain worked as a senior advisor to former UK Prime Minister Tony Blair. In 2008, he cofounded the think tank Quilliam, which "aims to challenge extremist narratives while advocating pluralistic, democratic alternatives that are consistent with universal human rights standards" and "stands for religious freedom, equality, human rights and democracy".

Husain later joined the Council on Foreign Relations in New York, where he was Senior Fellow in Middle Eastern Studies. He focused on trends within Arab Islamism, perceptions of the West in the Arab world, and US policy toward the Middle East, writing broadly on the Arab Spring and its implications for the region and foreign involvement.

He was appointed to the Freedom of Religion or Belief Advisory Group of the British Foreign and Commonwealth Office in 2014.

In 2017, Husain joined the Wilson Center as a Global Fellow in its Middle East Program. He is currently a Senior Fellow at Civitas: Institute for the Study of Civil Society in London, where he runs the 'Islam, the West, and Geopolitics' research project.

Views
While at the Council on Foreign Relations, Husain commented on U.S. policy on issues ranging from the 2011 U.S. congressional hearings on radicalization spearheaded by Rep. Peter King (R-NY) to the events of the Arab Spring and the death of Osama bin Laden. Since joining Civitas, Husain has commented on Islam and society, the British political system, the prospect of a Middle East Federation, and the role of Saudi Arabia in the geopolitics of Islam.

In an article in the Spectator at the end of 2019, Husain highlighted shifting alliances in the Middle East and the possibility of a new Arab-Israeli alliance. It was discussed widely in the region.

He has appeared on CNN, Fox, NPR, BBC, Al-Jazeera, and has been published in the New York Times, Financial Times, Guardian, National Review, Spectator, Telegraph and Jewish Chronicle, among other media outlets.

Islam and society 
Husain supports a liberal interpretation of Islamic jurisprudence, telling one journalist:

In traditional circles, Muslim women are not allowed to marry non-Muslim men...But in a pluralistic world in 2007, where non-Muslim men and Muslim women are marrying, you can't say, 'You can’t do that.'

Husain also questions teachings relating to an Islamic state or Caliphate, arguing: ... a dawlah ([a state] not 'the' state) can and should preserve and protect the religion. But 'the state' is not a rukn [pillar] of the deen (religion i.e. Islam) and without it the deen is not lost. And individual can remain a firm believer, a mutadayyin, without the imam and the jama'ah.He believes that Islam is fully compatible with Western democratic society, stating that the Quran does not teach a compulsion to faith or the murder of unbelievers. Husain has espoused this view in numerous commentaries, articles, and books, stating: … the lived reality of Islam as a religion of compassion, pluralism, coexistence, and peace is a far cry from how it is perceived by many in the West.The raison d’être of Islamic civilisations and the shariah for a thousand years was to provide five things: security, worship, preservation of the family, nourishment of the intellect and protection of property. These are called maqasid, or the higher objectives of the shariah. Britain provides these in multitudes for every Muslim today.Husain has also urged Muslims in the West to respond to the challenge of Islamic extremism. In an article in the Evening Standard, he stated that:Too often in Britain, in the name of freedom we provide protection for this murderous mindset. This mix of political ideology and puritan theology leads to the global curse of Salafi-Jihadism. We must stop protecting it...Most victims of Salafi-Jihadism are ordinary Muslims. In Britain, teachers, imams, politicians, social workers and families must not protect intolerance, but reject it.

Middle East Federation 
Husain has called for a federal union of Middle Eastern states along the lines of the European Union in order to defeat religious sectarianism in the region and promote economic and political cooperation.

He writes:After all, most of its problems – terrorism, poverty, unemployment, sectarianism, refugee crises, water shortages – require regional answers. No country can solve its problems on its own.

Saudi Arabia 
Husain is a noted critic of Saudi Arabia's human rights abuses and role in promoting Islamist extremism worldwide.

He has, however, spoken against isolating Saudi Arabia politically, arguing that the rise of Iranian theocracy in the Middle East requires ever closer alliances between the west and its Arab allies. Though critical of Saudi Prince Mohammed bin Salman, Husain has written in favour of western, and specifically British, support for his early steps towards reform in order to 'shape the future of a global shift towards peace and co-existence' between the Middle East and the West.

Bahrain 
In an op-ed for the New York Times in 2012, Husain analysed the political unrest in Bahrain in the wake of the Arab Spring after a visit to the reforming Crown Prince Salman bin Hamad bin Isa al-Khalifa. Noting the strong influence of the pro-Iran, anti-democracy cleric Ayatollah Issa Qasim on the Shiite opposition party Al Wefaq (which blocked bills for women's rights and equality that were supported by both the monarchy and Sunni parties), Husain urged the West not to "not provide diplomatic cover for rioters and clerics in the name of human rights and democracy".  

He called Bahrain a 'focal point of what is happening in the Middle East today – the battle to find a balance between preserving the best values of the Islamic tradition while the region eases its way into the modern world.'

Israel and Palestine 
Husain supports a two-state solution to end the Israel-Palestinian conflict. He has condemned the suicide bombing of Israeli civilians as well as the "killing of Palestinian civilians by the Hamas-led Gazan government".

He is opposed to the international boycott of Israel by activists, stating in The New York Times that:

ISIL 
Husain has sought to explain the theological pull of ISIL in the West through analyses of its fundamentalist ideological interpretations of Islam. He has urged western governments to take on a deeper understanding of its extremist worldview, arguing:
Unless we decimate the theological and ideological appeal of Isis, we will see the rise of an even more radicalised and violent force. Isis offers a caliphate and death. Our message needs to be of life, an Islam of the Muslim majority supported by 1,400 years of history. We must help Arab allies to reform, to create a regional Middle East union that transcends artificial borders, creates economic prosperity and reinstates Arab dignity. Terrorists cannot compete on this stage.

U.S. response to the Arab Spring 
On the Arab Spring, he has said:
The Arab world is no longer across the oceans. It is also on our streets here. Millions of American citizens are of Arab descent. Millions more are here as workers and students. What happens over there matters here. Can America make these people proud and empower them against Muslim extremists by changing the American story and making us all safer? Yes, it can. It must.

Husain advocates American soft power and leadership in modelling democracy. Countering the US response to the Egyptian military's raiding of NGO offices in 2012, he said:

The U.S. government should ask its military allies to return to their barracks and cease killing protesters—and that it should tie these demands to U.S. aid. ... The Arab revolutionaries did not look to China or Russia for a model of government. They looked to four-year presidential terms, inspired directly by American democracy. Islamist leaders such as Tunisia's Mohamed Ghannouchi condemn French secularism but highlight American accommodation of religion as a model of a secular state that is less hostile to religion.

However, Husain argued against U.S. military intervention in Syria, stating:

What happens in Syria does not stay in Syria. ... U.S. military intervention in Syria would likely see traditional state actors backing rival groups (Sunnis and Muslim Brotherhood by Turkey and Saudi Arabia, for example, Shia and Alawites by Iran, Druze and Christians by France, a former colonial master, or even indirectly Israel). Worse, there is a real possibility of the emergence of an al-Qaeda-inspired organization inside Syria to fight "Western imperialism," much like al-Qaeda or the "Sunni insurgency" in Iraq.

Al-Qaeda 
In a May 2011 op-ed in The Times, Husain warned against al-Qaeda's success as a brand:
Without doubt, the US was right to remove bin Laden, but it is wrong to think that his death will weaken al-Qaeda. Yes, a colossal psychological blow has been dealt, but al-Qaeda is no longer a mere organisation, but a global brand, an idea, a philosophy that now has its first Saudi martyr from the holy lands of Islam.

However, Husain criticized the September 2011 extrajudicial killing of American citizen Anwar al-Awlaki, explaining that it is "counterproductive to defeating terrorism in the long term because it demolishes the very values that America stands for: the rule of law and trial by jury." Furthermore, "An easier, cheaper and more effective way of discrediting al-Awlaki and countering his message would have been to disclose his three arrests for the solicitation of prostitutes ..."

Syrian Civil War 
Husain has warned of the involvement of Al-Qaeda and like minded groups in the Syrian Civil War:

Whether Assad stays or goes, jihadism now has a strong foothold in Syria. The Free Syrian Army may wish to dismiss its al-Qaeda allies as irrelevant in order to reassure the West and continue receiving Western support, but the jihadi websites and footage of al-Qaeda fighting in Damascus and Aleppo tell a different story.

Publications 
Husain is the author of three books: The Islamist, which was a finalist for the George Orwell prize for political writing, The House of Islam: A Global History, published in 2018, and Among the Mosques: A Journey Across Muslim Britain, published in 2021

References

External links
 Bio page at CFR.org 
 The Islamist – Penguin Books
 The Quilliam Foundation website

1974 births
Living people
English Muslims
Sunni Sufis
English people of Bangladeshi descent
British expatriates in the United States
Muslim writers
English autobiographers
Writers from London
People from the London Borough of Tower Hamlets
Alumni of Tower Hamlets College
Alumni of SOAS University of London
Damascus University alumni
Alumni of London Metropolitan University
Critics of Islamism
British people of Saudi Arabian descent